Declan "Dec" Burke (born 22 May 1972 from Limerick) is an Irish guitarist, keyboardist and vocalist.

Biography
Burke was born on 22 May 1972 in Limerick, Ireland, and moved to the UK in 1989. He has one son.

Career
Burke began as a keyboard player, before moving to guitar.

Burke performed with Frost* on their 2008 album Experiments in Mass Appeal and their 2010 live album The Philadelphia Experiment. He also performed with Darwin's Radio as guitarist / vocalist, recording 2 albums; 2006's Eyes of the World and 2009's Template for a Generation.

In 2010 he released his first solo album, Destroy All Monsters, which was recorded at his home studio and released via ProgRock Records in the US.

In 2016 he joined the Dutch prog band Dilemma during the recordings of their second album Random Acts of Liberation.

Discography

Darwin's Radio 
 Eyes of the World (2006)
 Template for a Generation (2009)

Frost* 
 Experiments in Mass Appeal (2008)
 The Philadelphia Experiment (2010)

Audioplastik 
 In the Head of a Maniac (2015)

Dilemma 
 Random Acts of Liberation (2019)

Dec Burke 
 Destroy All Monsters  (2010; ProgRock Records)
 Paradigms & Storylines  (2011; Ritual Echo Records)
 Book of Secrets  (2016; Festival Music)
 Life in Two Dimensions  (2021; Gravity Dream Music)

References

British rock guitarists
British male guitarists
Living people
1972 births
Frost* members
21st-century British guitarists
21st-century British male musicians